365 is Taiwanese Mandopop trio boyband JPM's second studio Mandarin album. It was first released on 30 November 2012 by Sony Music (Taiwan).

Album
The album was released a year after the first album Moonwalk. They use "Love" as the main theme of this album. In other words, each song is used to describe different types and stages of love. In addition with the theme of love, 365 album also emphasized the "Golden Triangle" concept to capture each members' individual firm and confidence and also to represent their strong brotherhood. Demonstrating the trio's mastery of a multitude of music styles, the new album's track list includes an electro-dance K-Pop-styled titular song "365 Days" especially produced by Korean producers Jay & Taemu. Moreover, the track list also includes a solo song for each member, and a collaboration with Kimberley Chen entitled "Internet". Once again, Liao Xiao Jie and Qiu Wang Zi took part in putting the album together as Liao filled the role of the producer for half of the album, lyricist of three songs and the composer of two songs, while Qiu is the lyricist of the main song, 365, of the album. The five main songs of the album are "365 days", "I Don't Miss You That Much", "Internet", "Singing 4 Love" and "She Wanna Go".

Track listing

Music videos
 365 天
 "我沒有很想你" (I Don't Miss You That Much)
 "Internet(ft. Kimberley Chen)"  
 "Singing 4 Love" 
 "She Wanna Go"

References

External links
  JPM page at Sony Music
 

2012 albums
Sony Music Taiwan albums
JPM (band) albums